The WCW World Heavyweight Championship was a professional wrestling world heavyweight championship originally used in World Championship Wrestling (WCW) and later, the World Wrestling Federation (WWF, now WWE). It was the original world title of the World Championship Wrestling promotion, spun off from the NWA World Heavyweight Championship. It existed in WCW from 1991 to 2001.

Following the acquisition of WCW by the WWF in March 2001, it became one of two world titles in the WWF, with its name being immediately abbreviated to the WCW Championship and finally, the World Championship in November. It continued to complement the then-WWF Championship until the following month, when both titles were unified to create the Undisputed WWF Championship. The Undisputed title retained the lineage of the WWF Championship, and the World Championship was retired.

Ric Flair was the first holder of the WCW World Heavyweight Championship, with Chris Jericho being the last. The title was the second of five to be represented by the historic Big Gold Belt, first introduced in 1986.

History

Formation 
In November 1988, Turner Broadcasting purchased Jim Crockett Promotions, which had promoted under the name "NWA World Championship Wrestling". While the promotion remained a member of the National Wrestling Alliance (NWA), the use of the NWA name was gradually reduced on televised programming, in favor of the name "World Championship Wrestling", or "WCW". On January 11, 1991, Ric Flair defeated Sting to win the NWA World Heavyweight Championship and was recognized as the WCW World Heavyweight Champion. The new championship was not initially represented by its own title belt, and WCW continued to use the NWA World Heavyweight Championship title belt. Because of this, WCW regularly claimed the NWA World Heavyweight Championship lineage for its own championship.

Separate championship 

On July 1, 1991, a creative disagreement with WCW Executive Vice President Jim Herd led to Flair leaving WCW for Vince McMahon's World Wrestling Federation. When Herd refused to return Flair's $25,000 deposit (that was left with the NWA), Flair kept the "Big Gold Belt" that had represented the NWA World Heavyweight Championship. A new belt was ordered, but was not ready in time for The Great American Bash on July 14. WCW was forced to use a belt owned by Dusty Rhodes from the defunct Championship Wrestling from Florida with a gold-colored plate tacked on with the words "WCW World Heavyweight Champion", which was awarded to Lex Luger after he defeated Barry Windham in a cage match for the vacant championship. The new belt appeared shortly after the event.

In 1992, the Big Gold Belt was used for the revived NWA World Heavyweight Championship, a co-promotional gimmick between WCW and New Japan Pro-Wrestling. Masahiro Chono won the G1 Climax in 1992 defeating Rick Rude in the finals while also having a broken neck in the process. Then in 1993 On January 4, The Great Muta won the NWA World Heavyweight title defeating Masahiro Chono, but eventually dropped it to Barry Windham at SuperBrawl III. Then at the "WCW Disney tapings", it was revealed that WCW had been changing titles around without the NWA agreeing on it, making it a breach of contract. In September 1993, WCW left the NWA for good over a dispute regarding the other NWA members demanding that NWA world champion be available for booking, and due to the use of the NWA World Heavyweight Championship on syndicated programming recorded months in advance. By fall 1993, Rick Rude was appearing at the "Disney tapings" as the NWA World Heavyweight Champion, despite the fact that in regards to the storyline, Flair, who had returned to WCW and regained the NWA title, was still champion. After leaving the NWA, WCW kept the Big Gold Belt, and it was renamed the WCW International World Heavyweight Championship.

Unification 
At Starrcade in December 1993, Flair won the WCW World Heavyweight Championship, by defeating Vader. WCW decided to unify the WCW World Heavyweight Championship (represented by the new belt) and International Championship (represented by the "Big Gold Belt"), by having Flair wrestle Sting in June 1994. Flair won and unified the WCW World Heavyweight Championship with the WCW International World Heavyweight Championship. The unified championship retained the lineage of the WCW World Heavyweight Championship, while the International Championship was retired. The belt design used from mid-1991 to mid-1994 to represent the WCW World Heavyweight Championship was dropped in favor of keeping the "Big Gold Belt", which had originally represented the title when it was established in January 1991.

During Hollywood Hogan's runs as champion in 1996–1997 and again in 1998–1999 (ie from his second to his fifth reign as champion), as part of the New World Order (nWo) storyline, the title was spray painted each time with the "nWo" initials in black and often announced during Hogan's title defenses as the nWo/WCW World Heavyweight Championship, while referred to by nWo members only as the nWo World Heavyweight Championship. Similarly, red paint was used for the nWo Wolfpack.

Acquisition by the WWF 

In March 2001, the World Wrestling Federation (WWF, now WWE) purchased the assets of World Championship Wrestling. Soon after, "The Invasion" took place and four of WCW's championships were defended on WWF programming including the WCW World Heavyweight Championship, which became known as the "WCW Championship". The WWF carried over the title, along with the United States Heavyweight Championship, Cruiserweight Championship, and the WCW Tag Team Championship.

After the "Invasion" concluded at Survivor Series in 2001, the title was rebranded as the "World Championship". The title was then unified with the WWF Championship at Vengeance, where Chris Jericho defeated The Rock and Stone Cold Steve Austin to win the World Championship and the WWF Championship respectively to become Undisputed WWF Championship. As a result, Jericho was the last WCW/World Champion, and he became the first Undisputed WWF Champion. The Big Gold belt itself would be used in tandem with the WWF Championship belt to represent the WWF Championship until a single belt was presented to then champion Triple H by Ric Flair in April 2002.

Reigns

See also 
 NWA World Heavyweight Championship
 WCW International World Heavyweight Championship
 World Heavyweight Championship (WWE)
 WWE Championship
 List of former championships in WWE
 World championships in WWE 
 Big Gold Belt

Notes 

In WCW, Flair was recognized as an eight-time champion but WWE only recognizes 6, counting his first reign as one of his 8 NWA title reigns and ignoring a title vacancy that occurred in 1994 and instead viewing that as one continuous reign.

References

External links 
 WWE.com – WCW World Championship history
 Wrestling-Titles.com: WCW World Heavyweight Title History

World Championship Wrestling championships
World heavyweight wrestling championships
Championships acquired by WWE